m0n0wall was an embedded firewall distribution of FreeBSD, one of the BSD operating system descendants. It provides a small image which can be put on Compact Flash cards as well as on CD-ROMs and hard disks.  It runs on a number of embedded platforms and generic PCs. The PC version can be run with just a Live CD and a floppy disk to store configuration data, or on a single Compact Flash card (with an IDE adapter). This eliminates the need for a hard drive, which reduces noise and heat levels and decreases the risk of system failure through elimination of moving parts found in older hard drives.

On February 15, 2015 Manuel Kasper announced the "m0n0wall project has officially ended. No development will be done anymore, and there will be no further releases," encouraging "all current m0n0wall users to check out OPNsense and contribute if they can."

Features 
m0n0wall provides for a web-based configuration and uses PHP exclusively for the GUI and bootup configuration. Additionally, it adopts a single XML file for configuration parameters.

Some functions of m0n0wall are:
 Stateful packet filter firewall
 IPsec and PPTP VPNs
 Inbound and Outbound Network Address Translation
 Captive portal
 Traffic shaper
 Inbound and Outbound port filtering
 Support for 802.1q compatible VLANs
 Multiple IP addresses on LAN and WAN ports
 IPS

Hardware

m0n0wall is installed on embedded hardware designed and manufactured by some companies.

Derivatives 
Similar hardware requirements
 t1n1wall: 2015 fork of m0n0wall after it was discontinued.
 SmallWall: Another 2015 fork of m0n0wall after its end-of-life, no activity since 2016.
 m0n0wall mod: Original m0n0wall with additional features (DHCP+PPTP, DHCP+PPPoE, static+PPPoE, L2TP, WAN eth interface), no activity since 2013.

Extended hardware requirements
 OPNsense: Forked from pfSense in 2015.
 pfSense: Forked from the m0n0wall project in 2004, first released in 2006.

Other usages (not a firewall)
 AskoziaPBX: An embedded telephone system.
 XigmaNAS: NAS Network-attached storage distro using FreeBSD, uses portions of m0n0wall web GUI.  Formerly NAS4Free.

See also

 Comparison of firewalls
 List of router or firewall distributions

References

External links
 
 

2003 software
BSD software
Firewall software
Free routing software
FreeBSD
Gateway/routing/firewall distribution
Routers (computing)